Christel Adnana Mina Khalil (born November 30, 1987) is an American actress.

Background
Khalil was born in Los Angeles, California, to a mother of Native American, African American, and European descent and a Pakistani father. Khalil has stated she identifies as mixed race. She has three older brothers and a younger paternal half-sister. In January 2017, in the wake of President Donald Trump's signing of Executive Order 13769, Khalil revealed that her father is an immigrant from his native country of Pakistan.

Career
Khalil is best known for her portrayal as Lily Winters on the CBS soap opera The Young and the Restless. At the 39th Daytime Emmy Awards on June 23, 2012, she won the Daytime Emmy Award for Outstanding Younger Actress in a Drama Series after four nominations in the category. In August 2018, she announced her decision to downgrade from being on contract with the show and instead continue on a recurring basis. Khalil explained the decision was driven by her desire to have more freedom in both her professional and personal life. She continued to make sporadic appearances on the show until being approached by current head writer and co-executive producer Josh Griffith in January 2020, to return to filming on a regular basis.

Khalil has had small roles in movies such as Dragon Fury, Matilda, Interview With the Assassin and White Like the Moon. She voiced Cornelia Hale in W.I.T.C.H., and also appeared on That's So Raven and Malcolm in the Middle, among other shows. Khalil also performed in Los Angeles theater productions before landing her role on The Young and the Restless. In 2012, she was featured in musician Johnny Britt's music video  for his single Beautiful Queen. In  spring 2018, Khalil co-starred in the independent thriller, Good Deed, which premiered on the Lifetime network in November 2018 under the title Sorority Stalker. In spring 2019, she was cast in the independent comedy We Need To Talk by writer and director Todd Wolfe.

Personal life
In September 2008, she married musician Stephen Hensley. The Young and the Restless co-star Elizabeth Hendrickson served as a bridesmaid while Bryton James was a groomsman. Khalil gave birth to their son on April 17, 2010, during an at home water birth. Bryton James is his godfather and actress Fadhia Marcelin is his godmother. She and Hensley split in early 2011 and divorced later that year. In 2015, Khalil stated she had been in a relationship with bar runner Ray Wicks for 4 years. Khalil ended the relationship in August 2015.  In the summer of 2018, Khalil stated that she in a relationship with Canadian businessman Sam Restagno, who works in private equity. The two met in 2016, during that years Coachella Valley Music and Arts Festival in Indio, California. In 2019, Khalil and her son relocated to Toronto, Ontario to be with Restagno, who was born and based there. In July 2020, Khalil moved back to Los Angeles.

She is best friends with Bryton James, who portrays her character's brother, Devon Hamilton on The Young and the Restless. She is also friends with several former and current The Young and the Restless co-stars, including Mishael Morgan and Nadine Heimann. In October 2015, she modeled for Heimann's non-profit, True Connection.

In June 2015, after the United States Supreme Court's decision on Obergefell v. Hodges, she voiced her support for same-sex marriage. Khalil has said one of her favorite hobbies is traveling because she loves experiencing different cultures and travel makes her feel connected to who she is as a person.

Filmography

Awards and nominations

References

External links

Christel Khalil Official Twitter on Twitter.com

1987 births
20th-century American actresses
21st-century American actresses
Living people
Actresses from Los Angeles
Daytime Emmy Award winners
Daytime Emmy Award for Outstanding Younger Actress in a Drama Series winners
American television actresses
African-American actresses
American voice actresses
American soap opera actresses
American child actresses
American film actors of Pakistani descent
American people who self-identify as being of Native American descent
20th-century African-American women
20th-century African-American people
21st-century African-American women
21st-century African-American people